William Davies (born 1976) is an English writer, political and sociological theorist. His work focuses on the issues of consumerism, happiness, and the history and function of expertise on society. Davies has written for a variety of newspapers and periodicals including The Guardian, New Left Review,  London Review of Books, and The Atlantic. In 2015 Davies published his second book The Happiness Industry, which assesses the relationship between consumer capitalism, big data and positive psychology. Davies is Professor of Political Economy at Goldsmiths, University of London, where he is Co-Director of The Political Economy Research Centre in London.

Works
The Limits of Neoliberalism: Authority, Sovereignty and the Logic of Competition (2014)
The Happiness Industry: How Government and Big Business Sold Us Well Being (2015)
Nervous States: Democracy and the Decline of Reason (2019)
This is Not Normal: The Collapse of Liberal Britain, Verso Books, 2020

Selected articles
 “Leave, and Leave Again”, London Review of Books (2019)
 "What is “neo” about Neoliberalism?", The New Republic (2017)
 "On mental health, the royal family is doing more than our government", The Guardian (2017)
 "The Age of Pain", The New Statesman (2017)

References

21st-century English writers
Anti-consumerists
English philosophers
Political philosophers
1976 births

Living people